Cigaritis syama, the club silverline, is a butterfly of the family Lycaenidae. It is found in South-East Asia.

The wingspan is 27–32 mm.

The larvae feed on Psidium guajava and Dioscorea batatus.

Subspecies
The subspecies of Cigaritis syama found in India are-
 Cigaritis syama peguanus (Moore, 1884)

References

syama
Butterflies of Singapore
Butterflies described in 1829